The Pakistan Labour Federation (PLF) is the union of national trade union center in Pakistan. It was founded in 2008.

Pakistan Labour Federation is affiliated with the larger world body of trade unions known as World Federation of Trade Unions based in Athens, Greece.

References

See also
A. B. M. Abdur Rahim

Trade unions in Pakistan
Labour history of Pakistan
Labour relations in Pakistan
World Federation of Trade Unions
Trade unions established in 1974
1974 establishments in Pakistan